The Blumenthal Award was founded by the American Mathematical Society in 1993 in memory of Leonard M. and Eleanor B. Blumenthal. 
The award was presented to the individual deemed to have made the most substantial contribution in research in the field of pure mathematics, and who was deemed to have the potential for future production of distinguished research in such field. It was awarded every four years for the most substantial Ph.D. thesis produced in the four year interval between awards. The fund that supported the award was discontinued and, thus, the award is no longer being made.

Winners
1993 – Zhihong Xia
1997 – Loïc Merel
2001 – Stephen Bigelow and Elon Lindenstrauss
2005 – Manjul Bhargava
2009 – Maryam Mirzakhani

See also

 List of mathematics awards

External links
Blumenthal Award at AMS website

Awards of the American Mathematical Society
Awards established in 1993